José Kelvin de la Nieve Linares (born August 28, 1986, in Los Alcarrizos, Dominican Republic) is a boxer who competed in the light flyweight weight class at the 2008 and 2012 Summer Olympics for Spain.

He became a Spanish citizen in 2000 and is based out of Huelva.  He has been competing with the Club Deportivo Yoon.  After failing to qualify for the 2004 Olympics, he won the bronze medal in the 2005 Mediterranean Games and was able to become the only boxer from Spain to box in Beijing.  He lost his Olympic debut to American southpaw Luis Yanez 9:12.

De la Nieve won silver at the 2008 European Amateur Boxing Championships in Liverpool, England after he lost to Hovhannes Danielyan in the final.

At the 2010 European Amateur Boxing Championships in Moscow, Russia he won the bronze medal after he lost to Paddy Barnes from Ireland in the Semifinals.

He qualified for the 2012 Summer Olympics, but again lost in the first round, this time to Carlos Quipo of Ecuador.

References

External links
Yahoo profile
Interview in Spanish

1986 births
Living people
Dominican Republic male boxers
Olympic boxers of Spain
Boxers at the 2008 Summer Olympics
Boxers at the 2012 Summer Olympics
Light-flyweight boxers
Naturalised citizens of Spain
Dominican Republic emigrants to Spain
Spanish male boxers
Boxers at the 2015 European Games
European Games competitors for Spain
Mediterranean Games gold medalists for Spain
Mediterranean Games bronze medalists for Spain
Competitors at the 2005 Mediterranean Games
Competitors at the 2013 Mediterranean Games
Mediterranean Games medalists in boxing